Boaz is a city in Marshall and Etowah counties in the U.S. state of Alabama. The Marshall County portion of the city is part of the Albertville Micropolitan Statistical Area. As of the 2020 census, the city's population was 10,107. Boaz was known for its outlet shops.

History
First settled in the 1850s, the town of Boaz was officially founded November 11, 1878, by the Sparks family of Georgia. A post office has been in operation since 1887. The city was named after Boaz, from the Bible. It was incorporated in 1897.

The Julia Street Memorial United Methodist Church, Snead Junior College Historic District, the Thomas A. Snellgrove Homestead and the Edward Fenns Whitman House are listed on the National Register of Historic Places. The Alabama Register of Landmarks and Heritage lists the Boaz Elementary School, the First Baptist Church and Cemetery, and the Methodist Episcopal Church, South.

In the early 1980s, the VF Corporation opened an outlet store in an abandoned factory, whose success prompted other retailers to open stores. In the late 1980s, Boaz was a tourist attraction with 130 outlet stores, attracting five million people per year. Retailers moved away from Boaz due to a dwindling customer base, dropping to 80 stores in the early 1990s, with the Great Recession of the 2000s driving away even more. In 2016, three buildings of the outlet center were demolished.

Geography
Boaz is located in southeastern Marshall County at  (34.202793, −86.160457) and extends south into Etowah County. It is bordered to the north by Albertville and to the southeast by Sardis City. U.S. Route 431 passes through the east side of the city, leading north  to Guntersville and south  to Gadsden.

Most of the city drains west to either Slab Creek or Clear Creek, tributaries of the Locust Fork of the Black Warrior River. The Tennessee Valley Divide crosses the east side of the city, with the eastern portions of the city draining to Short Creek, a north-flowing tributary of the Tennessee River.

Demographics

2020 census

As of the 2020 United States census, there were 10,107 people, 3,494 households, and 2,197 families residing in the city.

2010 census
At the 2010 census, there were 9,551 people, 3,712 households, and 2,479 families living in the city. The racial makeup of the city was 87.3% White, 1.8% Black or African American, 0.4% Native American, 0.7% Asian, 0.3% Pacific Islander, 7.9% from other races, and 1.6% from two or more races. 14.2% of the population were Hispanic or Latino of any race.

Of the 3,712 households 30.7% had children under the age of 18 living with them, 46.7% were married couples living together, 14.3% had a female householder with no husband present, and 33.2% were non-families. 29.6% of households were one person and 14.7% were one person aged 65 or older. The average household size was 2.52 and the average family size was 3.11.

The age distribution was 25.9% under the age of 18, 9.5% from 18 to 24, 26.0% from 25 to 44, 22.2% from 45 to 64, and 16.4% 65 or older. The median age was 36 years. For every 100 females, there were 90.0 males. For every 100 females age 18 and over, there were 95.4 males.

The median household income was $31,172 and the median family income was $42,973. Males had a median income of $32,446 versus $27,924 for females. The per capita income for the city was $17,697. About 11.7% of families and 16.0 of the population were below the poverty line, including 24.1% of those under age 18 and 17.1% of those age 65 or over.

2000 census
At the 2000 census, there were 7,411 people, 3,155 households, and 2,085 families living in the city. The racial makeup of the city was 93.50% White, 1.31% Black or African American, 0.47% Native American, 0.45% Asian, 0.04% Pacific Islander, 3.01% from other races, and 1.23% from two or more races. 4.98% of the population were Hispanic or Latino of any race.

Of the 3,155 households 28.7% had children under the age of 18 living with them, 50.8% were married couples living together, 12.6% had a female householder with no husband present, and 33.9% were non-families. 30.7% of households were one person and 16.3% were one person aged 65 or older. The average household size was 2.30 and the average family size was 2.86.

The age distribution was 23.0% under the age of 18, 8.3% from 18 to 24, 26.2% from 25 to 44, 23.3% from 45 to 64, and 19.2% 65 or older. The median age was 39 years. For every 100 females, there were 83.8 males. For every 100 females age 18 and over, there were 78.5 males.

The median household income was $25,699 and the median family income was $34,018. Males had a median income of $29,504 versus $21,750 for females. The per capita income for the city was $15,664. About 13.9% of families and 18.7% of the population were below the poverty line, including 20.7% of those under age 18 and 25.4% of those age 65 or over.

Education
In May 2004, five schools broke away from the Marshall County School system and formed the Boaz City School System.

Boaz is the site of Snead State Community College.

Climate
Climate is characterized by relatively high temperatures and evenly distributed precipitation throughout the year.  The Köppen Climate Classification subtype for this climate is "Cfa" (Humid Subtropical Climate).

Notable people
James Fischer, engineer who developed high-purity silicon technology for Texas Instruments
Tim Hodge, voice actor and director for Big Idea Entertainment
Jody Hunt, United States Assistant Attorney General (2018–2020)
Rose Maddox, country music singer-songwriter and fiddle player
Eddie Priest, former Major League Baseball pitcher
John Roberts, Navy Cross recipient

References

External links

Cities in Alabama
Populated places established in 1897
Cities in Marshall County, Alabama
Cities in Etowah County, Alabama
Huntsville-Decatur, AL Combined Statistical Area